John Warner Norton (7 March 1876 – 7 January 1934) was an American painter and muralist who pioneered the field in the United States.

Norton was born in Lockport, Illinois, the son of John Lyman Norton and Ada Clara Gooding Norton.  The family ran the Norton & Co. of Lockport.  Norton's study of law at Harvard University was broken off when the family's firm went bankrupt.  Before, and after a period of living as a cowboy and enlisting with the Rough Riders, he studied art at the Art Institute of Chicago (1897, 1899–1901); he would later teach there. His students included Frances Badger. He was influenced by the Armory Show and the Japanese printmaker Katsushika Hokusai.

At the time of his death on January 7, 1934, in Charleston, South Carolina of cancer, he was a popular and respected artist.

He was survived by his wife and his three children, a son and two daughters.

Honors
 William M. R. French memorial Gold Medal (1924)
 Norman Waite Harris Bronze Medal (1926)
 honorary Master of Fine Arts from the Art Institute of Chicago
 Gold Medal of Honor for Mural Painting from the Architectural League of New York (1931), for his paintings in the Tavern Club in Chicago.

References

 
 Gray, Mary Lackritz (2001) A Guide to Chicago's Murals. University Of Chicago Press.
 Tallmadge, Thomas and Tom Lea (1935) John W. Norton, American Painter. Lakeside Press: Chicago (privately printed).
 John Warner Norton (catalogue raisonné). Illinois State Museum.

External links

 
 

1876 births
1934 deaths
People from Lockport, Illinois
19th-century American painters
19th-century American male artists
American male painters
20th-century American painters
Harvard Law School alumni
School of the Art Institute of Chicago alumni
American muralists
Painters from Illinois
Deaths from cancer in South Carolina
20th-century American male artists